Rasbora spilotaenia is a species of cyprinid fish in the genus Rasbora which occurs in Sumatra.

References 

Rasboras
Cyprinid fish of Asia
Freshwater fish of Indonesia
Taxa named by Carl Leavitt Hubbs
Taxa named by Martin Ralph Brittan
Fish described in 1954